Quarterback is an upcoming American streaming television documentary series developed for Netflix. The National Football League (NFL) and Netflix partnered to develop the series, while NFL Films, 2PM Productions, and Omaha Productions will produce the series.

Development and release
The NFL and Netflix announced the docu-series on February 22, 2023. The announcement of the series followed the success of various sports documentary series on Netflix, beginning with their Drive to Survive series; Netflix also launched the tennis- and golf-themed series Break Point and Full Swing earlier in 2023.

The NFL had not done business with Netflix prior to Quarterback. Producers for the series include NFL Films, Omaha Productions, and 2PM Productions. 2PM Productions is Kansas City Chiefs quarterback Patrick Mahomes' production studio, while Omaha Productions is the production studio of former NFL quarterback Peyton Manning. Manning will executive produce the series along with Ross Ketover, Pat Kelleher, and Keith Cossrow of NFL Films.

Mahomes, Minnesota Vikings quarterback Kirk Cousins, and Atlanta Falcons quarterback Marcus Mariota are set to be the three quarterbacks featured in the series. The three quarterbacks wore a mic during every game of the 2022 NFL season; this audio will be used in the series. This was the first time the NFL allowed quarterbacks to be mic'd up in each game of a season. Netflix was also given special access to Mahomes during the season, which culminated in him winning Super Bowl LVII and being named the game's MVP. The Vikings finished the season having won the NFC North, while Mariota is documented during his first season with the Falcons.

Netflix initially ordered one season of the series, set to release in the summer of 2023.

References

2020s American documentary television series
2020s American television series
2022 National Football League season
2023 American television series debuts
American football television series
Atlanta Falcons
Documentary television series about sports
English-language Netflix original programming
Kansas City Chiefs
Minnesota Vikings
Netflix original documentary television series
NFL Films
Upcoming Netflix original programming